Dionigi Donnini (8 April 1681 – 1743) was an Italian painter, who was active at Modena.

Born into a noble family in Correggio, he began as a pupil of Francesco Stringa. He then moved to Bologna where he worked under Carlo Cignani, then became a pupil under Giovanni Giuseppe dal Sole. He was also active in  Forlì, Pescia, Turin, Rimini, Bergamo, Faenza and Tivoli. He painted with Gasparo Bazzani a great hall in the Palazzo Milano a fresco commemorating the marriage of Ferdinand of Austria and Maria Beatrice.

References
Storia della Litteratura Italiana nel Secolo decimo-ottavo, Volume 6, by Antonio Lombardi, Venice, Francesco Andreola Pub. 1832. page 346–347.

1681 births
1780 deaths
People from the Province of Reggio Emilia
17th-century Italian painters
Italian male painters
18th-century Italian painters
Italian Baroque painters
Fresco painters
18th-century Italian male artists